Sigurd Marcussen (20 April 1905 – 20 December 2006) was a Norwegian politician for the Labour Party.

In 1935, he was elected to Risør city council. After the Second World War he moved to Søndeled and was elected to the municipal council there in 1951, but never took the seat as he got a leading position in his trade union. He served as a deputy representative to the Parliament from Aust-Agder during the term 1950–1953. In 2006 he was awarded honorary membership of his party.

References

1905 births
2006 deaths
Labour Party (Norway) politicians
Deputy members of the Storting
Aust-Agder politicians
Norwegian trade unionists
Norwegian centenarians
Men centenarians